This is a list of stand-up comedians from the United States.

A

B

C

D

E

F

G

H

I

J

K

L

M

N

O

P

Q

R

S

T

U

V

W

Y

Z

See also 
 List of New York Improv comedians
 List of stand-up comedians

References

 
Stand-up comedians
United States stand-up